David H. Ikard is professor of African-American and Diaspora studies at Vanderbilt University since 2017. Ikard was previously a professor of English and director of Africana studies at the University of Miami. He also taught at Florida State University and at the University of Tennessee–Knoxville.

Ikard earned a Bachelor of Arts and a Master of Arts from North Carolina State University in 1994 and in 1997 respectively. He also earned a PhD from the University of Wisconsin–Madison in 2002.

In March 2018, Ikard gave a talk at a TEDx in Nashville, Tennessee. During the talk, he debunked myths about civil rights activist Rosa Parks and explained why white people should care about the whitewashing of black history.

Personal life 
Ikard was born in Troutman, North Carolina and currently resides in Nashville.

Bibliography 

 Breaking The Silence: Toward a Black Male Feminist Criticism (2007)
 Nation of Cowards: Black Activism in Barack Obama's Post-Racial America (2012)
 Blinded by the Whites: Why Race Still Matters in 21st-Century America (2013)
 Lovable Racists, Magical Negroes, and White Messiahs (2017)

References 

Living people
Year of birth missing (living people)
North Carolina State University alumni
University of Wisconsin–Madison alumni
Vanderbilt University faculty
American sociologists
American male non-fiction writers
21st-century American male writers
American political activists
Writers from North Carolina